Taylor River is located on Vancouver Island in the province of British Columbia, Canada. It has an elevation of 53 metres. 

The river is the main tributary of Sproat Lake, which is linked to the Alberni Inlet – one of British Columbia’s most famous historic salmon runs. The river is flanked by Highway 4, a major highway, on one side, and a logging road on the other.  

The area around the Taylor River is very sparsely populated, and consists mainly of coniferous forest. Oceanic climate prevails in the area.

References

Rivers
Rivers of Vancouver Island